Mersin İdmanyurdu (also Mersin İdman Yurdu, Mersin İY, or MİY) Sports Club; located in Mersin, east Mediterranean coast of Turkey in 1977–78. The 1977–78 season was the sixth season of Mersin İdmanyurdu (MİY) football team in First League, the first level division in Turkey. They have relegated to second division at the end of the season. It was the second relegation from first division after 1973–74. Team's bad performance continued in Cup matches as well.

The team started the season with coach Kadri Aytaç. However Aytaç left the club and became the manager of Rizespor after the 7th round. Trainers Seyfi Alanya and Turgut Kafkas managed the team for the rest of the first half games. Orhan Yüksel became the coach at the start of the second half of the season. Yüksel completed the season.

Pre-season
The team has prepared for the season at Uludağ. Preparation games:
 07.08.1977 - Balıkesirspor-MİY: 3-0.
 The team played two jubilee matches on 10 August for Garay from Adana Demirspor and Güray from MİY on 17 August.
 18.08.1977 - MİY-Gaziantepspor: 1-1.

1977–78 First League participation
First League was played with 16 teams in its 21st season, 1977–78. Last two teams relegated to Second League 1978–79. Mersin İY finished 16th with 3 wins and relegated to second division next year. It was worst season of the team in First League.

Results summary
Mersin İdmanyurdu (MİY) 1977–78 First League summary:

Sources: 1977–78 Turkish First Football League pages.

League table
Mersin İY's league performance in First League in 1977–78 season is shown in the following table.

Won, drawn and lost points are 2, 1 and 0. F belongs to MİY and A belongs to corresponding team for both home and away matches.

Results by round
Results of games MİY played in 1977–78 First League by rounds:

First half

Second half

1977–78 Turkish Cup participation
1977–78 Turkish Cup was played for the 16th season as Türkiye Kupası by 89 teams. First and second elimination rounds were played in one-leg elimination system. Third and fourth elimination rounds and finals were played in two-legs elimination system. Mersin İdmanyurdu participated in 1977–78 Turkish Cup and eliminated at round 3 by Sivasspor. Sivasspor was eliminated at round 4. Trabzonspor won the Cup for the 2nd time.

Cup track
The drawings and results Mersin İdmanyurdu (MİY) followed in 1977–78 Turkish Cup are shown in the following table.

Note: In the above table 'Score' shows For and Against goals whether the match played at home or not.

Game details
Mersin İdmanyurdu (MİY) 1977–78 Turkish Cup game reports is shown in the following table.
Kick off times are in EET and EEST.

Source: 1977–78 Turkish Cup pages.

Management

Club management
Turhan Lokmanoğlu was club president.

Coaching team

1977–78 Mersin İdmanyurdu head coaches:

Note: Only official games were included.

1977–78 squad
Stats are counted for 1977–78 First League matches and 1977–78 Turkish Cup (Türkiye Kupası) matches. In the team rosters five substitutes were allowed to appear, two of whom were substitutable. Only the players who appeared in game rosters were included and listed in the order of appearance.

Sources: 1977–78 season squad data from maçkolik com, Milliyet, and Cem Pekin Archives.

Transfer news from Milliyet:
 Transfers in: Erdinç (Kayserispor); Erol (Balıkesirspor), Oktay (Muhafızgücü); Nihat, Bülent (professionalized, MİY youth team); Erman, Selçuk (Ankaragücü); Mehmet, Zeki (Tirespor); Celal (Tekirdağspor); Eser (Konya Ereğlispor); Mehmet (Tarsus İdmanyurdu). Müjdat was called for national team for Bulgaria match by coach Metin Türel (13.09.1977).
 Transfers out: Rüçhan (Kırıkkalespor, who were promoted to first league); Müjdat (Adana Demirspor); Tahir (Diyarbakırspor); Hikmet (Karagümrük); Erman (Şekerspor); K.Erol (Düzcespor).

See also
 Football in Turkey
 1977–78 Turkish First Football League
 1977–78 Turkish Cup

Notes and references

Mersin İdman Yurdu seasons
Turkish football clubs 1977–78 season